Twining Farm, also known as the David and Elizabeth Twining Farm, is a historic home and farm located at Newtown Township, Bucks County, Pennsylvania. The stone farmhouse was built in two stages. They are a -story, stone eastern section, with a later three-bay, -story western addition built in 1832.  A frame wing and bow window were added about 1940. Also on the property are a contributing stable, chicken house, and bank barn complex.  The farm was featured in three of four Newtown farmscape paintings by noted artist Edward Hicks (1780-1849). Hicks had resided for 10 years at the farm as the foster son of Elizabeth and David Twining.

It was added to the National Register of Historic Places in 1982.

Gallery

References

Farms on the National Register of Historic Places in Pennsylvania
Houses completed in 1832
Houses in Bucks County, Pennsylvania
National Register of Historic Places in Bucks County, Pennsylvania